Hou Yi is a mythological Chinese archer. He was also known as Shen Yi and simply as Yi. He is also typically given the title of "Lord Archer". He is sometimes portrayed as a god of archery descended from heaven to aid mankind. Other times, he is portrayed as either simply half-divine or fully mortal. His wife, Chang'e, is a lunar deity.

Lore
In a Chinese mythology, there were 10 suns. Initially, the 10 suns would cross the sky one by one, but one day all 10 suns came out at once scorching the earth. Hou Yi was tasked by the mythical King Yao to rein in the suns. Hou Yi first tried to reason with the suns. When that didn't work, he then pretended to shoot at them with his bow to intimidate them. When the suns again refused to heed Hou Yi's warnings, he began to shoot at them one by one. As each one fell, they turned into three-legged ravens. Finally, only one sun was left, and King Yao as well as the sun's mother Xihe, asked for him to be spared for the prosperity of man. In other variants, the last arrow was stolen by either a brave boy or King Yao himself, who realized the land requires a sun.

Hou Yi was also known for the slaying, maiming and imprisonment of several other mythical beasts such as the Yayu, Zaochi, Jiuying, Dafeng, Fengxi, and Xiushe. He had been directed by King Yao to go after these creatures as they were all causing trouble for humans. 

Hou Yi was gifted the pill of immortality by the gods. One of Hou Yi's apprentices called Peng Meng broke into Hou Yi's house in search of the pill of immortality while Hou Yi was out hunting. His wife Chang'e swallowed the pill before Peng Meng could get it. After eating the pill, Chang'e rose up to the moon.

In another version, after Hou Yi shot down the suns, he was proclaimed as a hero-king by the people. However, once he was crowned king, he became a tyrant and subjugated his people. Hou Yi had also obtained an immortality elixir from Xiwangmu to live forever. Chang'e was afraid that if he lived forever, that people would forever be victim to his cruelty. Therefore, Chang'e consumed the elixir herself and floated away. As she did, Hou Yi tried to shoot her down but failed. For her sacrifice, people have taken to honoring her during the Mid-Autumn Festival.

Historical references
Hou Yi was deposed by his lieutenant Han Zhuo in the eighth year of the reign of Taikang's nephew .

In popular culture 
 Hou Yi appears in the video game Smite as a hunter
 Hou Yi appears on the wall of Dao Shi’s office in the fifth episode of TenCent’s “Three Body”, and is mentioned by the characters as an allusion to the Trisolaran predicament.
 Hou Yi appears in Over the Moon, on flashbacks and as a ghost.
 Hou Yi appears in the 2022 mobile RPG game, Dislyte, renamed as Dayi. His ability in the game references the shooting down of the 9 suns.
In the light novel "second Life ranker " the character Bow god Jang Wei is said to be Hou yi's disciple.
 Mo Xiang Tong Xiu’s 2016 xianxia/wuxia web novel Modao Zushi (魔道祖师) may reference this mythology with its “Sunshot Campaign.” The story features a tyrannical clan seemingly too powerful to defeat; lesser clans’ union against them—to “shoot down the sun” —is called the Sunshot Campaign.

See also 
 Mid-Autumn Festival for variants of this legend
 Korean creation narratives

References 

Chinese male archers
Chinese gods
Mythological archers
Mythological hunters